Gonzalo Suárez may refer to:

Gonzalo Suárez Rendón (1503-1590), Spanish conquistador
Casa del Fundador Gonzalo Suárez Rendón, museum in Colombia named after the conquistador
Gonzalo Suárez (director) (born 1934), Spanish filmmaker
Gonzo Suárez (born 1963), Spanish video game director
Gonzalo Suárez Llano (born 1994), Spanish footballer